Pierre-Richard Prosper (born September 19, 1963) is an American lawyer, prosecutor and former government official. He served as the second United States Ambassador-at-Large for War Crimes Issues under President George W. Bush from 2001 to 2005.

Biography
Born in Denver, Colorado, to two physicians who emigrated from Haiti, Prosper was raised in Upstate New York. He graduated from Shenendehowa High School in Clifton Park, New York; Boston College and Pepperdine University School of Law.

Prosper was a Deputy District Attorney for Los Angeles County, California from 1989 to 1994. His last two years in this position were spent in the Hardcore Gang Division of the Bureau of Special Operations where he prosecuted gang-related murders. From 1994 to 1996, he was an Assistant United States Attorney for the Central District of California in Los Angeles.  He was assigned to the Narcotics Section, Drug Enforcement Task Force, where he investigated and prosecuted major international drug cartels.

From 1996 to late 1998, Prosper served as a war crimes prosecutor for the United Nations International Criminal Tribunal for Rwanda.  He was appointed lead trial attorney and prosecuted Prosecutor vs. Jean-Paul Akayesu, the first-ever case of genocide under the 1948 Convention on the Prevention and Punishment of the Crime of Genocide. In the 14-month trial, he won additional life-sentence convictions for crimes against humanity and broke new ground in international law by convincing the Tribunal to recognize rape committed in time of conflict as an act of genocide and a crime against humanity. Prosper recounts the trial in the 2015 documentary film, The Uncondemned.

Prosper served as a career prosecutor at the U.S. Department of Justice where he was Special Assistant to the Assistant Attorney General for the Criminal Division in 1999. From 1999 to 2001, Prosper was detailed to the State Department where he served as the Special Counsel and Policy Adviser to the previous Ambassador-at-Large for War Crimes Issues.

In September 2013, he became a member of the International Centre for Settlement of Investment Disputes (ICSID) Panel of Arbitrators and of Conciliators, where he will be asked by disputing parties or by the ICSID to serve on conciliation commissions seeking to resolve international investment disputes commenced under the ICSID Convention or the ICSID Additional Facility Rules. Prosper was nominated by President George W. Bush on May 16, 2001 to become the second U.S. Ambassador-at-Large for War Crimes Issues.  After being confirmed by the U.S. Senate, he was sworn in on July 13, 2001. He served until late 2005. As the President's envoy and senior diplomat, Prosper traveled worldwide conducting diplomatic negotiations and consultations with heads of state, foreign ministers, and senior government officials from over 60 different countries. He also engaged foreign parliaments and multilateral and international organizations to build support for US policies. He regularly visited conflict zones in efforts to secure peace, stability, and the rule of law. In this capacity, Ambassador Prosper formulated and coordinated US policy responses to atrocities and attacks against civilians throughout the world. He reported directly to US Secretaries of State Colin Powell and Condoleezza Rice and advised the President of the United States, Secretary of Defense, Attorney General, National Security Advisor, Chairman of the Joint Chiefs of Staff, Director of the Central Intelligence Agency, White House Counsel and other senior US government officials. After September 11, 2001, Ambassador Prosper played a key role in developing policy to confront terrorism. He was also the chief US negotiator and lead diplomat responsible for engaging nations regarding their nationals held in Guantanamo Bay, Cuba and captured by US forces in combat. From 2008-2012, Ambassador Prosper was elected to the United Nations' Committee on the Elimination of Racial Discrimination, where he served as Vice-Chairman for the last two years of his service.

Currently, Prosper holds the position of Partner in the Los Angeles office of Arent Fox LLP, where he has handled several high-profile cases. These include advising and representing the Democratic Republic of Timor-Leste on matters related to the Petroleum sector, investment and infrastructure development; successfully negotiated the release of an American citizen detained in the Islamic Republic of Iran through repeated travels to Iran and engagement with senior Iranian officials; and advises and represents the government of Rwanda on a range of matters including international arbitration, litigation, and contract negotiation, among others. Prosper also serves as a trustee on the Boston College Board of Trustees.

In September 2018, Ambassador Prosper was appointed to the Pepperdine University School of Law.

Sometime between October 2018 and May 2019, Chinese video surveillance company Hikvision retained Prosper to advise the company regarding human rights compliance according to an emailed statement from a Hikvision spokesman. Hikvision cameras were used in Uyghur internment camps.

References

External links
 Arent Fox Profile for Prosper
 Committee on the Elimination of Racial Discrimination
 Biographical data on UN website
 

1963 births
Living people
American politicians of Haitian descent
Members of the Committee on the Elimination of Racial Discrimination
United States Ambassadors-at-Large for War Crimes Issues
Lawyers from Denver
District attorneys in California
Boston College alumni
Pepperdine University School of Law alumni
United States Ambassadors-at-Large
Wasserstein Fellows
American officials of the United Nations